is a male track and field sprinter from Japan.

International competition

1Competed only in the heat.

National titles
Japanese Championships
400 m: 1999, 2001

Personal bests
400 metres - 45.05 s (2000)

References

External links

Jun Osakada at JAAF  (archived)
Jun Osakada at JOC 

1974 births
Living people
Sportspeople from Hyōgo Prefecture
Japanese male sprinters
Olympic male sprinters
Olympic athletes of Japan
Athletes (track and field) at the 1996 Summer Olympics
Athletes (track and field) at the 2000 Summer Olympics
Athletes (track and field) at the 2004 Summer Olympics
Asian Games gold medalists for Japan
Asian Games medalists in athletics (track and field)
Athletes (track and field) at the 1998 Asian Games
Medalists at the 1998 Asian Games
Competitors at the 1995 Summer Universiade
Japan Championships in Athletics winners